Darren Crowley (born 1987 in Bandon, County Cork) is an Irish sportsperson. He plays hurling with his local club Bandon and has been a member of the Cork senior inter-county team since 2009 when he was called up due to the 2008-2009 Cork players strike.

References

1987 births
Living people
Cork inter-county hurlers
Bandon hurlers